The Christian School (Takeley)  is an independent Christian school located in Takeley, Bishop's Stortford, Essex.

The school caters for children of 7 through to 16 years of age. The school runs a curriculum that is designed to meet the requirements of the English National Curriculum and the school is inspected by Ofsted.

The school agrees with the Department for Education's definition of British values  as a whole:
 democracy,
 the rule of law,
 individual liberty
 receprocated respect and tolerance of those with different faiths and beliefs
At the Christian School (Takeley), pupils will encounter these principles throughout everyday school life. The school recognises the dependence of each value on the others and, for example, does not respect or tolerate a faith statement or belief that does not uphold the democracy and rule of law of the United Kingdom or the individual liberties of UK citizens, especially those whose characteristics are protected under the Equality Act.

The curriculum teaches pupils to be critical thinkers testing the validity of rules or expectations.

In accordance with the ethos of the school the understanding is that, in God, there is a higher authority and the teaching of the whole Christian Bible is the basis of faith of the staff.

The school is an equal opportunities employer. As a designated faith school, the school is allowed to take into consideration a teacher's faith in hiring decisions as allowed in the Equality Act 2010.

The school is part of the Christian Schools' Trust and is a member of the Independent Schools Association.

As of 2018, the school has approximately 60 pupils and 20 staff, who are a mixture full-time and part-time.

History
The Christian School (Takeley) was founded by a group of parents and friends in 1989 to provide a Christian education, fostering Christian faith and values. Today the school includes families from a wide geographical area, who belong to a number of different churches or none. In 2017 the school became a member of the Independent School Association and the Independent Schools Council

Site and facilities 
The school operates from the site of Takeley Chapel, which is home to Takeley Congregational Church which itself is an independent church. The site consists of the Edwardian chapel building, recreation hall and a converted stable block which is now a workshop and laboratory.

There are nine dedicated teaching rooms at the site, with other facilities including a library and kitchen. The school also has a playground, gazebo and allotments to the front.

References

External links
 
 
 

Private schools in Essex
Educational institutions established in 1989
1989 establishments in England
Takeley